ASTRO-C, renamed Ginga (Japanese for 'galaxy'), was an X-ray astronomy satellite launched from the Kagoshima Space Center on 5 February 1987 using M-3SII launch vehicle. The primary instrument for observations was the Large Area Counter (LAC). Ginga was the third Japanese X-ray astronomy mission, following Hakucho and Tenma (also Hinotori satellite - which preceded Ginga - had X-ray sensors, but it can be seen as a heliophysics rather than X-ray astronomy mission). Ginga reentered the Earth's atmosphere on 1 November 1991.

Instruments

 Large Area Proportional Counter (LAC 1.5-37 keV)
 All-Sky Monitor (ASM 1-20 keV)
 Gamma-ray Burst Detector (GBD 1.5-500 keV)

Highlights 

Discovery of transient Black Hole Candidates and study of their spectral evolution. 
Discovery of weak transients in the galactic ridge. 
Detection of cyclotron features in 3 X-ray pulsars: 4U1538-522, V0332+53, and Cep X-4. 
Evidence for emission and absorption Fe feature in Seyfert probing reprocessing by cold matter. 
Discovery of intense 6-7 keV iron line emission from the Galactic Center region.

External links 

NASA/GSFC information of Ginga (ex Astro-C)

Space telescopes
X-ray telescopes
Satellites of Japan
Satellites formerly orbiting Earth
1987 in spaceflight
Spacecraft launched in 1987